Solar System Research is a peer-reviewed scientific journal which focuses on objects in the Solar System. The journal is published by Nauka through Springer Science+Business Media. It is the English version of the Russian publication Astronomicheskii Vestnik (Астрономический вестник), which was first published in 1967. The English version started in 2000 with Volume 34.

Abstracting and indexing
The journal is abstracted and indexed in the following databases:

According to Journal Citation Reports, the journal has a 2020 impact factor of 0.706.

References

External links

Astronomy journals
Publications established in 1967
English-language journals
Nauka academic journals
Springer Science+Business Media academic journals
7 times per year journals